The Chelmsford Center Historic District is a historic district encompassing the historic heart of the town of Chelmsford, Massachusetts.  It extends from the town's central square in the east, where the intersection of Billerica Road and Chelmsford Street is located, west beyond the junction of Littleton and North Roads with Westford Street, and from there north along Worthen Road.  It includes the area that was the 17th-century heart of the town, including its common and first burying ground, and has been the town's civic heart since its founding.

The district was added to National Register of Historic Places in 1980.

See also
National Register of Historic Places listings in Middlesex County, Massachusetts

References

Chelmsford, Massachusetts
Historic districts in Middlesex County, Massachusetts
National Register of Historic Places in Middlesex County, Massachusetts
Historic districts on the National Register of Historic Places in Massachusetts